The Ain Allah attack took place in a heavily guarded neighborhood in the southwest of Algiers on 3 August 1994 during the Algerian Civil War. The shootout occurred when at least four or seven gunmen dressed as police drove to a French guard post near a school and attempted to plant a car bomb in the neighbourhood which houses the French embassy in Algiers. Two French military guards were killed by surprise after being shot by automatic weapons. When gunmen tried to park a car with a bomb outside a building, a shootout broke out which resulted in the death of another guard and two French consular employees. Another guard was seriously injured and the bomb was safely diffused. The Armed Islamic Group of Algeria claimed responsibility for the attack.

References 

1994 in Algeria
Algerian Civil War
Attacks in 1994